The 2005 Copa Colsanitas Seguros Bolivar was a women's tennis tournament played on outdoor clay courts at the Club Campestre El Rancho in Bogotá, Colombia that was part of Tier III of the 2005 WTA Tour. It was the eighth edition of the tournament and ran from 14 February through 20 February 2005. Second-seeded Flavia Pennetta won the singles title and earned $27,000 first-prize money.

Finals

Singles

 Flavia Pennetta defeated  Lourdes Domínguez Lino 7–6(7–4), 6–4
 It was Pennetta's 1st singles title of the year and the 2nd of her career.

Doubles

 Emmanuelle Gagliardi /  Tina Pisnik defeated  Ľubomíra Kurhajcová /  Barbora Strýcová 6–4, 6–3

References

External links
 Official website 
 Official website 
 ITF tournament edition details
 Tournament draws

Copa Colsanitas
Copa Colsanitas
2005 in Colombian tennis